Vampires, Pirates & Aliens is a 2000 CITV children's television program by Cosgrove Hall Films based on the book by Colin Hawkins and Jacqui Hawkins. The story follows the adventures of the vampire known as "the Blods", and features a ship names "The Mad Maggot" including the character "Captain Blunder" and crew.

Voices

 Keith Wickham
 Kate Harbour
 David Vickery
 Melissa Sinden

"Vampires, Pirates & Aliens: Bloodsucking Beasties! (Vol 1)", a DVD containing 7 episodes, was released on 23 April 2008.

External links
Cosgrove Hall

2000 British television series debuts
2000 British television series endings
2000s British animated television series
British children's animated science fantasy television series
ITV children's television shows
British television shows based on children's books
Television series by Cosgrove Hall Films